Mahovo  is a village in Croatia. It is on the Sava river, about 15km north of Sisak.

Populated places in Sisak-Moslavina County